The College Street Historic District in Harrodsburg in Mercer County, Kentucky was listed on the National Register of Historic Places in 1979.  The , along College St. from North Lane to Factory St., included 27 contributing buildings.

It was deemed significant as "an uninterrupted concentration of 19th- and early-20th-century buildings that line a significant street in Harrodsburg, the oldest permanent settlement in Kentucky. American architectural evolution is well represented in this diverse collection, but the most visually prominent style is the Greek Revival a style that flourished and gained wide acceptance in Harrodsburg and Mercer County."

It includes Doricham, at 409 N. College St., which was separately listed on the National Register in 1976.

References

Historic districts on the National Register of Historic Places in Kentucky
Greek Revival architecture in Kentucky
Queen Anne architecture in Kentucky
National Register of Historic Places in Mercer County, Kentucky
Harrodsburg, Kentucky